The 2021–22 BYU Cougars women's basketball team represented Brigham Young University during the 2021–22 NCAA Division I women's basketball season. It was head coach Jeff Judkins's twenty first and final season at BYU. The Cougars, members of the West Coast Conference, play their home games at the Marriott Center.

Before the season

Departures
Due to COVID-19 disruptions throughout college sports, the NCAA ruled that the 2020–21 season would not count against the eligibility of any women's basketball player. This meant that all seniors in 2020–21 had the option to return in 2021–22.

Newcomers

2021–22 media

BYU Sports Media

All Cougars home games are being shown on BYUtv or the BYUtv App. Conference road games are being shown on WCC Network. All remaining non-conference road games are also being streamed. Streaming partners for those games can be found on the schedule.

Roster

Schedule

|-
!colspan=8 style=| Exhibition

|-
!colspan=8 style=| Non-conference regular season

|-
!colspan=8 style=| WCC regular season

|-
!colspan=8 style=| WCC Tournament

|-
!colspan=8 style=| NCAA tournament

Game Summaries

Exhibition: Westminster
Broadcasters: Spencer Linton, Kristen Kozlowski, and Jason Shepherd 
Starting Lineups:
Westminster: Abby Mangum, Rae Falatea, Sarah McGinley, Ashley Greenwood, Hunter Krebs
BYU: Shaylee Gonzales, Maria Albiero, Tegan Graham, Lauren Gustin, Paisley Harding

Lipscomb
Broadcasters: Spencer Linton, Kristen Kozlowski, and Jason Shepherd 
Series History: First Meeting
Starting Lineups:
Lipscomb: Jordan Peete, Blythe Pearson, Bella Vinson, Jalyn Holcomb, Casey Collier
BYU: Shaylee Gonzales, Maria Albiero, Tegan Graham, Lauren Gustin, Paisley Harding

Fresno State
Broadcasters: Dave McCann and Kristen Kozlowski 
Series History: BYU leads 8–6
Starting Lineups:
Fresno State: Hanna Cavinder, Haley Cavinder, Amiee Book, Yanina Todorova, Maria Guimaraes
BYU: Shaylee Gonzales, Maria Albiero, Tegan Graham, Lauren Gustin, Paisley Harding

Arizona State
Broadcasters: Spencer Linton, Kristen Kozlowski, and Jason Shepherd 
Series History: BYU leads 6–4
Starting Lineups:
Arizona State: Taya Hanson, Jaddan Simmons, Mael Gilles, Maggie Besselink, Jade Loville
BYU: Shaylee Gonzales, Maria Albiero, Tegan Graham, Lauren Gustin, Paisley Harding

Boise State
Broadcasters: Jarom Jordan and Kristen Kozlowski 
Series History: BYU leads 11–8
Starting Lineups:
Boise State: Mary Kay Naro, Anna Ostlie, Dominique Leonidas, Elodie Lalotte, Abby Muse
BYU: Shaylee Gonzales, Maria Albiero, Tegan Graham, Lauren Gustin, Paisley Harding

Utah State
Broadcasters: Spencer Linton, Kristen Kozlowski and Jason Shepherd 
Series History: BYU leads 38–4
Starting Lineups:
Utah State: Laci Hawthorne, E'Lease Stafford, Manna Mensah, Olivia Wikstrom, Kaylin Randhawa
BYU: Shaylee Gonzales, Maria Albiero, Tegan Graham, Lauren Gustin, Paisley Harding

Florida State
Broadcasters: Tom James and Brigid Merenda
Series History: Series even 1–1
Starting Lineups:
Florida State: River Baldwin, Sammie Puisis, Sara Bejedi, Morgan Jones, Valencia Myers
BYU: Shaylee Gonzales, Maria Albiero, Tegan Graham, Lauren Gustin, Paisley Harding

West Virginia
Broadcasters: Tom James and Brigid Merenda 
Series History: First Meeting 
Starting Lineups:
BYU: Shaylee Gonzales, Maria Albiero, Tegan Graham, Lauren Gustin, Paisley Harding
West Virginia: Jayla Hemingway, Kirsten Deans, Esmery Martinez, Kari Niblack, Madisen Smith

Utah
Broadcasters: Krista Blunk and Mary Murphy
Series History: Utah leads 67–41
Starting Lineups:
BYU: Shaylee Gonzales, Maria Albiero, Tegan Graham, Lauren Gustin, Paisley Harding
Utah: Dru Glyten, Brynna Maxwell, Jenna Johnson, Kennady McQueen, Dasia Young

Oklahoma
Broadcasters:  Chad McKee and Dan Hughes
Series History: Oklahoma leads 5–1 
Starting Lineups:
BYU: Shaylee Gonzales, Maria Albiero, Tegan Graham, Lauren Gustin, Paisley Harding
Oklahoma: Kelbie Washington, Nydia Lampkin, Ana Llanusa, Madi Williams, Taylor Robertson

Washington State
Broadcasters: Jarom Jordan, Kristen Kozlowski and Kiki Solano
Series History: Washington State leads 6–5
Starting Lineups:
Washington State: Krystal Leger-Walker, Charlisse Leger-Walker, Ula Motuga, Johanna Teder, Bella Murekatete
BYU: Shaylee Gonzales, Maria Albiero, Tegan Graham, Lauren Gustin, Paisley Harding

Montana State
Broadcasters:  Mark Martello
Series History: BYU leads 8–3 
Starting Lineups:
BYU: Shaylee Gonzales, Maria Albiero, Tegan Graham, Lauren Gustin, Paisley Harding
Montana State: Darian White, Kola Bad Bear, Katelynn Limardo, Leia Beattie, Gabby Mocchi

San Francisco
Broadcasters: George Devine 
Series History: BYU leads 22–7 
Starting Lineups:
BYU: Shaylee Gonzales, Maria Albiero, Tegan Graham, Lauren Gustin, Paisley Harding
San Francisco: Kia Vaalavirta, Marianna Klavina, Amalie Langer, Jessica McDowell-White, Claudia Langarita

Pacific
Broadcasters: Dave McCann, Kristen Kozlowski, and Jason Shepherd 
Series History: BYU leads 17–4 
Starting Lineups:

Pacific: Anaya James, Cecilia Holmberg, Elizabeth Elliott, Erica Adams, Sam Ashby
BYU: Shaylee Gonzales, Maria Albiero, Tegan Graham, Lauren Gustin, Paisley Harding

Saint Mary's
Broadcasters:  Spencer Linton, Kristen Kozlowski, and Kiki Solano
Series History: BYU leads 13–10 
Starting Lineups:
Saint Mary's: Taycee Wedin, Madeline Holland, Tayla Dalton, Hannah Rapp, Ali Bamberger
BYU: Shaylee Gonzales, Maria Albiero, Tegan Graham, Lauren Gustin, Paisley Harding

Loyola Marymount
Broadcasters: Brendan Craig and Gary Craig
Series History: BYU leads 19–2 
Starting Lineups:
BYU: Shaylee Gonzales, Maria Albiero, Tegan Graham, Lauren Gustin, Paisley Harding
Loyola Marymount: Aspyn Adams, Kimora Sykes, Nicole Rodriguez, Ariel Johnson, Alexis Mark

San Diego
Broadcasters:  Anne Marie Anderson and Mary Murphy
Series History: BYU leads 13–8 
Starting Lineups:
BYU: Shaylee Gonzales, Maria Albiero, Tegan Graham, Lauren Gustin, Paisley Harding
San Diego: Steph Gorman, Erica Martinsen, Jordyn Edwards, Kendall Bird, Sydney Hunter

San Diego
Broadcasters: Spencer Linton, Kristen Kozlowski, and Jason Shepherd
Series History: BYU leads 14–8 
Starting Lineups:
San Diego: Steph Gorman, Erica Martinsen, Jordyn Edwards, Kendall Bird, Sydney Hunter
BYU: Shaylee Gonzales, Maria Albiero, Tegan Graham, Lauren Gustin, Paisley Harding

Santa Clara
Broadcasters:  Dave McCann and Kristen Kozlowski
Series History: BYU leads 22–2 
Starting Lineups:
Santa Clara: Merle Wiehl, Bryce Nixon, Lara Edmanson, Lindsey VanAllen, Lana Hollingsworth 
BYU: Shaylee Gonzales, Maria Albiero, Tegan Graham, Lauren Gustin, Paisley Harding

San Francisco
Broadcasters: Dave McCann, Kristen Kozlowski, and Jason Shepherd
Series History: BYU leads 23–7 
Starting Lineups:
San Francisco: Jasmine Gayles, Kennedy Dickie, Jessica McDowell-White, Claudia Langarita, Lucija Kostic
BYU: Shaylee Gonzales, Maria Albiero, Tegan Graham, Lauren Gustin, Paisley Harding

Portland
Broadcasters:  Ann Schatz and Jennifer Mountain
Series History: BYU leads 26–5 
Starting Lineups:
BYU: Shaylee Gonzales, Maria Albiero, Tegan Graham, Lauren Gustin, Paisley Harding
Portland: Keeley Frawley, Haylee Andrews, Alex Fowler, Maddie Muhlheim, Lucy Cochrane

Gonzaga
Broadcasters: Ann Schatz and Jennifer Mountain
Series History: Gonzaga leads 18–14 
Starting Lineups:
BYU: Shaylee Gonzales, Maria Albiero, Tegan Graham, Lauren Gustin, Paisley Harding
Gonzaga: Anamaria Virjoghe, Abby O'Connor, Kayleigh Truong, Cierra Walker, Melody Kempton

Pepperdine
Broadcasters:  Spencer Linton and Kristen Kozlowski
Series History: BYU leads 23–4 
Starting Lineups:
Pepperdine: Malia Bambrick, Meaali'i Amosa, Becky Obinma, Kendyl Carson, Ally Stedman
BYU: Shaylee Gonzales, Maria Albiero, Tegan Graham, Lauren Gustin, Paisley Harding

Saint Mary's
Broadcasters: Ben Ross and Evan Giddings 
Series History: BYU leads 14–10 
Starting Lineups:
BYU: Shaylee Gonzales, Maria Albiero, Tegan Graham, Lauren Gustin, Paisley Harding 
Saint Mary's: Taycee Wedin, Madeline Holland, Tayla Dalton, Jade Kirisome, Ali Bamberger

Loyola Marymount
Broadcasters: Spencer Linton, Kristen Kozlowski, and Jason Shepherd
Series History: BYU leads 20–2 
Starting Lineups:
Loyola Marymount: Cassandra Gordon, Jasmine Jones, Nicole Rodriguez, Ariel Johnson, Alexis Mark
BYU: Shaylee Gonzales, Maria Albiero, Tegan Graham, Lauren Gustin, Paisley Harding

Gonzaga
Broadcasters: Spencer Linton, Kristen Kozlowski, and Kiki Solano
Series History: Gonzaga leads 18–15 
Starting Lineups:
Gonzaga: Anamaria Virjoghe, Abby O'Connor, Kayleigh Truong, Cierra Walker, Melody Kempton
BYU: Shaylee Gonzales, Maria Albiero, Tegan Graham, Lauren Gustin, Paisley Harding

Santa Clara
Broadcasters: Joe Ritzo
Series History: BYU leads 22–2 
Starting Lineups:
BYU: Shaylee Gonzales, Maria Albiero, Tegan Graham, Lauren Gustin, Paisley Harding
Santa Clara: Merle Wiehl, Lindsey VanAllen, Ashley Hiraki, Danja Stafford, Lana Hollingsworth

Pacific
Broadcasters: Don Gubbins 
Series History: BYU leads 18–4 
Starting Lineups:
BYU: Shaylee Gonzales, Maria Albiero, Tegan Graham, Lauren Gustin, Paisley Harding
Pacific: Anaya James, Cecilia Holmberg, Jordan Cruz, Elizabeth Elliott, Sam Ashby

WCC Semifinal: Portland
Broadcasters:  Spencer Linton and Kristen Kozlowski
Series History: BYU leads 26–6 
Starting Lineups:
Portland: Rose Pflug, Emme Shearer, Alex Fowler, Maddie Muhlheim, Lucy Cochrane
BYU: Shaylee Gonzales, Maria Albiero, Tegan Graham, Lauren Gustin, Paisley Harding

WCC Championship: Gonzaga
Broadcasters: Dave Flemming and Christy Thomaskutty
Series History: Gonzaga leads 18–16 
Starting Lineups:
Gonzaga: Anamaria Virjoghe, Abby O'Connor, Kayleigh Truong, Cierra Walker, Melody Kempton
BYU: Shaylee Gonzales, Maria Albiero, Tegan Graham, Lauren Gustin, Paisley Harding

NCAA 1st Round: Villanova
Broadcasters:  Sam Gore and Aja Ellison
Series History: Villanova leads 1–0 
Starting Lineups:
Villanova: Lucy Olsen, Lior Garzon, Brianna Herlihy, Brooke Mullin, Madison Siegrist
BYU: Shaylee Gonzales, Maria Albiero, Tegan Graham, Lauren Gustin, Paisley Harding

Conference Honors
Shaylee Gonzales, Lauren Gustin, and Paisley Harding were selected to the 2021–22 All-WCC Preseason Women's Basketball Team. 

Paisley Harding won the Week 2 WCC Player of the Week conference award. 

Shaylee Gonzales won the Week 3 WCC Player of the Week conference award. Additionally she won the St. Pete Showcase MVP title. 

Lee Cummard went 3–0 and won the St. Pete Showcase as interim coach after Jeff Judkins had to sit out due to a positive COVID-19 test.

On February 10 Jeff Judkins recorded coaching career win 450 when BYU defeated Pepperdine. 

On Senior Day (February 19) the Cougars set an all-time record high attendance for a women's basketball game at the Marriott Center when 6,289 fans attended the game against the Zags.

Rankings
2021–22 NCAA Division I women's basketball rankings

^The Coaches poll did not release a week 1 ranking.

References

BYU Cougars women's basketball seasons
BYU
BYU Cougars
BYU Cougars
BYU